José Alfonso Nieto Martínez (born 30 October 1991) is a Mexican footballer, who last played as a forward for.

References

External links
 
 

Living people
1991 births
Mexican footballers
Association football forwards
Club Universidad Nacional footballers
C.S. Herediano footballers
Carabobo F.C. players
Liga MX players
Liga Premier de México players
Liga de Balompié Mexicano players
Liga FPD players
Venezuelan Primera División players
Footballers from Mexico City
Mexican expatriate footballers
Mexican expatriate sportspeople in Costa Rica
Mexican expatriate sportspeople in Venezuela
Expatriate footballers in Costa Rica
Expatriate footballers in Venezuela